Russian athletes competed in the 2020 Summer Paralympics under the acronym of the Russian Paralympic Committee (RPC), using a flag depicting a one-off emblem representing the committee.

On 9 December 2019, the World Anti-Doping Agency (WADA) had banned Russia from all international sport for a period of four years, after the Russian government was found to have tampered with lab data that it provided to WADA in January 2019 as a condition of the Russian Anti-Doping Agency being reinstated. This penalty was later reduced to two years, and Russian athletes were permitted to compete as long as they used a non-national flag and delegation name. On 26 April 2021, it was confirmed that Russian athletes would compete under the name "RPC" as long as the full name of the organization was not used, and that the delegation would use a specially created emblem representing the Russian Paralympic Committee (as the actual emblem of the committee features the Russian national flag). This was slated to apply to both the 2020 Summer Paralympics and the 2022 Winter Paralympics (however, the team was ultimately banned from the latter due to the 2022 Russian invasion of Ukraine).

Medalists

| width=78% align=left valign=top |

|style="text-align:left; width:22%; vertical-align:top;"|

Competitors
The following is the list of number of competitors participating in the Games:

*Guides in athletics and paratriathlon, competition partners in boccia are counted as athletes at the Paralympics.

Sanction stipulations 
On 9 December 2019, the World Anti-Doping Agency (WADA) banned Russia from all international sport for four years, after it was found that data provided by the Russian Anti-Doping Agency had been manipulated by Russian authorities with a goal of protecting athletes involved in its state-sponsored doping scheme. Russian athletes would be allowed to participate in the Paralympic under a neutral flag and with a neutral designation.

Russia later appealed against the WADA decision in the CAS. On 17 December 2020, the CAS announced its decision, reducing the suspension to two years and allowing Russian athletes to participate under the flag of the Russian Paralympic Committee, rather than under a neutral flag, and use the Russian national colours. 

For all victory ceremonies, Pyotr Tchaikovsky's Piano Concerto No. 1 will be used in lieu of the Russian national anthem.

Archery 

Russian athletes form some of the participating nations.

Men

Women

Mixed team

Athletics

Track & road events
Men

Women

Mixed

Field events
Men

Women

Badminton

Boccia 

Russian athletes form some of the participating nations, having qualified through the BISFed 2019 European Championships.

Cycling 

Russian athletes form some of the participating nations, for both men and women.

Road
Men

Women

Track
Men

Women

Mixed

Equestrian 

Russian athletes form one of the team slots of qualifying nations.

Individual

Team

Goalball 

Summary

Women's tournament

The Russia women's national goalball team secured a Paralympic Games position through first place in the women's category of the 2018 World Championships.

Team roster

Group stage

Quarterfinal

Judo

Men

Women

Paracanoeing 

Russian athletes form some of the participating nations.

Qualification Legend: FA = Qualify to final (medal); FB = Qualify to final B (non-medal)

Paratriathlon

Powerlifting

Rowing

Russia qualified two boats for each of the following rowing classes into the Paralympic regatta. All of them qualified after successfully entering the top seven for men's single sculls and top eight for mixed coxed four at the 2019 World Rowing Championships in Ottensheim, Austria. 

Qualification Legend: FA=Final A (medal); FB=Final B (non-medal); R=Repechage

Shooting

Sitting volleyball 

Russian athletes form some of the participating nations. Men qualified in the 2019 ParaVolley Europe Zonal Championships, while women qualified through 
the 2018 World ParaVolley Championships.

Summary

Men's tournament 

Group play

Semifinal

Gold medal match

Women's tournament 

Group play

Fifth place match

Swimming

Men

Women

Mixed

Table tennis 

Russian athletes form some of the participating nations.
Men

Women

Taekwondo

Russia qualified four athletes to compete at the Paralympics competition. All of them qualified by finishing top six in world ranking.

Wheelchair fencing

Men

Women

Wheelchair tennis

Russia qualified two player entries for wheelchair tennis. One of them qualified through the  world rankings, while the other qualified under the bipartite commission invitation allocation quota.

Notes

See also 
 Russian Olympic Committee athletes at the 2020 Summer Olympics
 Russia at the Olympics
 Russia at the Paralympics

References 

Nations at the 2020 Summer Paralympics
2020
2021 in Russian sport